Tangari is a village in the Selau district of Bougainville, Papua New Guinea. It is located in north-western Bouganville near the Chabai Catholic mission.

It is one of the model villages covered by the Bougainville Healthy Community Programme (BHCP).

References

Papua New Guinea articles missing geocoordinate data
Populated places in the Autonomous Region of Bougainville